The Subhash Nagar Metro Station is located on the Blue Line of the Delhi Metro.

Subhash Nagar is a place between Rajouri Garden, Tagore Garden on one side Ashok Nagar on other side in west part in New Delhi. Subhash Nagar is a part of Hari Nagar assembly constituency and West Delhi parliamentary constituency. It is authorised and being developed by the Delhi Government.

History and culture
Subhash Nagar is originally a refugee colony with people who migrated from West Punjab, Sindh and Northwest Frontier Province. It has also seen recent migration from Uttarakhand, Rajasthan, West Bengal, East Punjab and South India. The PIN code of Subhash Nagar is 110027.

The station

Station layout

Malls and the multiplexes
Pacific mall in Subhash Nagar Extn. metro station was inaugurated recently. Ajanta Mall & Multiplexes is under construction on the same site where the famous old Ajanta Movie Theatre is situated in Ajay Enclave Extension, which is adjacent a residential colony called Ajay Enclave.

"|Gate No-2
! style="width:30%;"|Gate No-3
|-
|  || || 
|-
| ||  || 
|}

Neighborhood
Rajouri Garden, Ashok Nagar, Hari Nagar, Manak Vihar, Tagore Garden, Khayala, Maya Enclave, Mayapuri and Ajay Enclave.

Connections

Bus
Delhi Transport Corporation bus routes number 234, 308, 410, 801, 810, 813, 813CL, 816, 816A, 817, 817A, 817B, 823, 832, 833, 847, 861A, 871, 871A, WDM (-) Subhash Nagar serves the station from outside metro station stop.

Metro Connectivity
Subhash Nagar is nearby two metro stations: Tagore Garden Metro Station and the Tilak Nagar Metro Station.

See also

Delhi
List of Delhi Metro stations
Transport in Delhi
Delhi Metro Rail Corporation
Delhi Suburban Railway
Delhi Monorail
Delhi Transport Corporation
West Delhi
New Delhi
National Capital Region (India)
List of rapid transit systems
List of metro systems

References

External links

 Delhi Metro Rail Corporation Ltd. (Official site) 
 Delhi Metro Annual Reports
 
 UrbanRail.Net – Descriptions of all metro systems in the world, each with a schematic map showing all stations.

Delhi Metro stations
Railway stations opened in 2005
Railway stations in West Delhi district